Neukirchen is a small town in the Schwalm-Eder district in Hesse, Germany.

Constituent communities

The town is made up of a main town bearing the same name as the whole town, and the centres of Asterode, Christerode, Hauptschwenda, Nausis, Wincherode, Riebelsdorf, Rückershausen and Seigertshausen.

History
Neukirchen had its first documentary mention in 1142 in a document from the Hersfeld monastery. In 1351, Neukirchen was granted town rights. In the Middle Ages, the town was bedevilled by fires that repeatedly broke out. One catastrophe in 1533 destroyed three fourths of all the town's houses.

Politics

The town council is made up of 31 members.
CDU 12 seats
SPD 12 seats
FDP 3 seats
UBL (citizens' coalition) 2 seats
FWG (citizens' coalition) 2 seats
(as of municipal elections held on 26 March 2006)

Culture and sightseeing

Museums
The Heimatmuseum ("Homeland Museum") has documents about the town's history, a complete school classroom and prehistoric collections.

Churches

Nikolaikirche
This church's history is closely tied to the town's. The earliest known mention of Neukirchen is in a monastery document from 1142. It is assumed that a few years later, the choir at the Nikolaikirche was built. About 1350, the two-aisled symmetrical hall and the three lower floors of the tower were built onto the choir, as it was at this time that "Nuwenkirchen", as it was then called, was granted town rights. According to an inscription above the doorway of the south aisle, remodelling and expansion were undertaken in 1497 that led to the church being transformed into a three-aisled Gothic hall church with an irregular transept and an eight-sided choir area. Since the Reformation's introduction in Hesse in 1526, Evangelical services have been held there.

The 36-m-high tower, the town's landmark, is built as a mighty military tower. The tower's roof is ringed with a walk with a tracery gallery from about 1500. At that same height, the tower watchman's old dwelling can be found. A fascinating impression about the "tower family's" life awaits anyone who books a tower tour here. The climb up the 132 steps is made worthwhile by the outstanding view over Neukirchen and the Knüllgebirge. Since 2001, in the tower's parlour, civil "tower wedding ceremonies" have been performed. Information is available by calling 06694/80810.

Kirche Christerode
The Christerode Church's oldest parts have their roots in the Middle Ages. The church is a plain hall whose ceiling rests on a beam laid lengthwise on a mighty oaken column. Over the last few years, the building, threatened as it was by collapse, has been thoroughly renovated. The organ was built about 1912 by Peter Battenberg, an organ builder from Weißenborn, and in 2001 it was restored.

Kirche Hauptschwenda
Hauptschwenda lies at an elevation of 500 m, making it the highest parish in the church district of Ziegenhain. The place was mentioned in 1223 under the name "Eizicheswinden". Even then, there was a chapel. The place is likely even older. In 1506, Hauptschwenda was mentioned as a pilgrimage place with its Annenquelle (spring, and now called Lindenborn) that could work wonders. The church was bigger before 1537 than the building that stands today. Worth seeing inside are some wall paintings from the 16th century that have been renovated over a long period of time and an organ from 2003.

Sport
Neukirchen became known nationwide for SC Neukirchen's First Football Team, who played for four years in the Regionalliga (football), which still had four divisions at that time

Economy and infrastructure

Transport
Neukirchen lies on Federal Highway (Bundesstraße) B 454 (Kirchhain – Niederaula). The town also belongs to the North Hesse Transport Network.

Personalities 

 Manfred Roeder (1929-2014), convicted right-wing extremist and Holocaust denier

References

External links
Kirche Christerode
Kirche Hauptschwenda

Schwalm-Eder-Kreis